Lühesand is a small island of  in the river Elbe (here the Lower Elbe),  east of Stade in Lower Saxony, Germany. The island, named after the easterly located mouth of the Lühe, forms part of Hollern-Twielenfleth (northwestern two thirds of the island) and Steinkirchen (southeastern third). It can only be reached by ferry from Grünendeich's westerly exclave Sandhörn and contains a large camping site, on which many continuous campers stay. The southern carrying pylons of Elbe Crossing 1 and Elbe Crossing 2 have been located on Lühesand.

References

External links

Stade (district)
Elbe
Islands of Lower Saxony
River islands of Germany